The Pont Ruzizi I is one of bridges in Bukavu  which serves as one of the borders customs between Democratic Republic of Congo in the town of Bukavu and Rwanda in the Cyimbogo region over the Ruzizi River.

This bridge is located at the rear of the mountain housing the Saio military camp, built in 1943 after the Congolese army's victory in Ethiopia over the Italian East Africa on June 8, 1941 during the Second World War. The bridge was then built to allow trade between the Germanempire Ruanda-Urundi and Belgian Congo, whose works lasted 12 years from 1908 to 1920.

The bridge, 88 m long, is the first longest bridge in Bukavu city, located 20 km from Pont Ruzizi I, which also serves as the customs border with Rwanda at Cangungu.

See also
 Ruzizi River
 Pont Ruzizi I
 Pont Ruzizi III

References

Ruzizi
Bridges in Rwanda
Bridges in the Democratic Republic of the Congo